Drop ball may refer to:
A dropped-ball in association football
A sinkerball in baseball
A similar type of pitch in softball
Drop Ball is also a game from the "Cartoon Network" series "Adventure Time"

See also
Drop kick